Anosizato Andrefana is a municipality in Analamanga Region, in the  Central Highlands of Madagascar. It belongs to the district of Antananarivo-Atsimondrano and its population numbers to 26,107 in 2019. The capital city, Antananarivo, lies across the Ikopa River to the east.

National road No.1 crosses Anosizato, making Antananarivo's main gateway to Tsiroanomandidy and Miarinarivo.

References

Populated places in Analamanga